Aleyda Quevedo Rojas (born 1972, Quito) is an Ecuadorian poet and journalist. She is considered one of the most relevant voices in contemporary Latin American poetry.

In 2017, the House of Ecuadorian Culture published the book Cierta manera de la luz sobre el cuerpo, a compilation of Quevedo's poems to that point. Writer Jesús David Curbelo described Quevedo's work as the "witness of a life and a supplier of feelings in which she scrutinizes first the body, then emotions, then finally the mind."

In July 2018, Quevedo attended a colloquium commemorating Jorge Carrera Andrade with writers César Eduardo Carrión, Javier Cevallos Perugachi, José Gregorio Vásquez, Jesús David Curbelo, and Mario Pera.

Works
 Cambio en los climas del corazón (1989)
 La actitud del fuego (1994)
 Algunas rosas verdes (1996)
 Espacio vacío (2001)
 Soy mi cuerpo (2006)
 Dos encendidos, Manuela y Bolívar (2010)
 Cierta manera de la luz sobre el cuerpo (2017)

References

Bibliography

 
 
 
 
 
 
 
 
 
 

Living people
1972 births
People from Quito
Ecuadorian women poets
21st-century Ecuadorian women